Julius Michael Johannes Maggi (9 October 1846 – 19 October 1912) was a Swiss entrepreneur, inventor of precooked soups and Maggi sauce. He is best known for founding Maggi, which was merged with Nestle in 1947.

Biography 
Julius was born in Frauenfeld, Switzerland in 1846. In 1869, he inherited his father's hammer mill.

He died in 1912 at the age of 66.

Career 
In the early 1880s, Julius began experimenting to invent a new type of flour. In 1882, he finally began selling flour and founded Maggi. In 1886, he launched Maggi seasoning.

In 1886, Julius invented the first instant soup in the world. It was invented in his Kemptthal factory.

By 1888, he began selling to countries all around Europe, including Germany, France, and Italy.

Gallery

See also
 Portable soup

References

1846 births
1912 deaths
People from Frauenfeld
Swiss businesspeople
Vevey